A tidal bore, often simply given as bore in context, is a tidal phenomenon in which the leading edge of the incoming tide forms a wave (or waves) of water that travels up a river or narrow bay, reversing the direction of the river or bay's current. It is a strong tide that pushes up the river, against the current.

Description 
The funnel-like shape not only increases the tidal range, but it can also decrease the duration of the flood tide, down to a point where the flood appears as a sudden increase in the water level. A tidal bore takes place during the flood tide and never during the ebb tide.

A tidal bore may take on various forms, ranging from a single breaking wavefront with a roller – somewhat like a hydraulic jump – to undular bores, comprising a smooth wavefront followed by a train of secondary waves known as whelps. Large bores can be particularly unsafe for shipping but also present opportunities for river surfing.

Two key features of a tidal bore are the intense turbulence and turbulent mixing generated during the bore propagation, as well as its rumbling noise. The visual observations of tidal bores highlight the turbulent nature of the surging waters. The tidal bore induces a strong turbulent mixing in the estuarine zone, and the effects may be felt along considerable distances. The velocity observations indicate a rapid deceleration of the flow associated with the passage of the bore as well as large velocity fluctuations. A tidal bore creates a powerful roar that combines the sounds caused by the turbulence in the bore front and whelps, entrained air bubbles in the bore roller, sediment erosion beneath the bore front and of the banks, scouring of shoals and bars, and impacts on obstacles. The bore rumble is heard far away because its low frequencies can travel over long distances. The low-frequency sound is a characteristic feature of the advancing roller in which the air bubbles entrapped in the large-scale eddies are acoustically active and play the dominant role in the rumble-sound generation.

Etymology
The word bore derives through Old English from the Old Norse word bára, meaning "wave" or "swell."

Effects
Tidal bores can be dangerous. Certain rivers such as the Seine in France, the Petitcodiac River in Canada, and the Colorado River in Mexico to name a few, have had a sinister reputation in association with tidal bores. In China, despite warning signs erected along the banks of the Qiantang River, a number of fatalities occur each year by people who take too much risk with the bore. The tidal bores affect the shipping and navigation in the estuarine zone, for example, in Papua New Guinea (in the Fly and Bamu Rivers), Malaysia (the Benak in the Batang Lupar), and India (the Hooghly River bore).

On the other hand, tidal bore-affected estuaries are rich feeding zones and breeding grounds of several forms of wildlife. The estuarine zones are the spawning and breeding grounds of several native fish species, while the aeration induced by the tidal bore contributes to the abundant growth of many species of fish and shrimp (for example in the Rokan River, Indonesia). The tidal bores also provide opportunity for recreational inland surfing, such as the Seven Ghosts bore on the Kampar River, Indonesia.

Scientific studies
Scientific studies have been carried out at the River Dee in Wales in the United Kingdom, the Garonne and Sélune in France, the Daly River in Australia, and the Qiantang River estuary in China. The force of the tidal bore flow often poses a challenge to scientific measurements, as evidenced by a number of field work incidents in the River Dee, Rio Mearim, Daly River, and Sélune River.

Rivers and bays with tidal bores
Rivers and bays that have been known to exhibit bores include those listed below.

Asia
 Ganges–Brahmaputra, India and Bangladesh
 Indus River, India and Pakistan
 Sittaung River, Burma
 Batang Lupar or Lupar River, near Sri Aman, Malaysia. The tidal bore is locally known as benak.
 Batang Sadong or Sadong River, Sarawak, Malaysia.
 Bono, Kampar River, at Meranti Bay, Pelalawan, Indonesia. The phenomenon is feared by the locals to sink ships.

Oceania

Australia
 Styx River, Queensland
 Daly River, Northern Territory

Papua New Guinea
 Fly River
 Turama River

Europe

Ireland
 River Shannon, up the Shannon Estuary to Limerick, Ireland: 21 September 2013

United Kingdom

 River Dee, Wales and England
 River Mersey. The bore tends to form around the Manchester Ship Canal.
Also other tributaries of the Humber Estuary.
 River Parrett
 River Welland
 The Arnside Bore on the River Kent
 River Great Ouse
 River Ouse, Yorkshire. Like the Trent bore, this is also known as "the Aegir".
 River Eden
 River Esk
 River Nene. This was also known as the Eagre.
 River Nith
 River Lune, Lancashire
 River Ribble, Lancashire
 River Yealm, Devon
 River Leven, Cumbria

Belgium
 Durme, Flanders

France
The phenomenon is generally named un mascaret in French. but some other local names are preferred.
 Seine had a significant bore until the 1960s, locally named la barre. Since then, it has been practically eliminated by dredging and river training.
 Bay of Mont-Saint-Michel including Couesnon, Sélune, and Sée
 Arguenon
 Baie de la Frênaye
 Vire
Sienne
 Vilaine, locally named le mascarin
 Dordogne
 Garonne

North America

United States

 The Turnagain Arm of Cook Inlet, Alaska.
 Historically, the Colorado River had a tidal bore up to 6 feet, that extended 47 miles up river.
 Small tidal bores, only a few inches in height, have been observed advancing up tidal bayous on the Mississippi Gulf Coast.
 The bay inlet of the Crissy Field Marsh, in San Francisco, California, can exhibit tidal bores near high tide.

Canada
With the Bay of Fundy having the highest tidal range in the world, most rivers draining into the upper bay between Nova Scotia and New Brunswick have significant tidal bores. They include:
After considerable political controversy, the causeway gates were opened on April 14, 2010, as part of the Petitcodiac River Restoration Project and the tidal bore began to grow again. The restoration of the bore has been sufficient that in July 2013, professional surfers rode a -high wave  up the Petitcodiac River from Belliveau Village to Moncton to establish a new North American record for continuous surfing.
 The Shubenacadie River in Nova Scotia. When the tidal bore approaches, completely drained riverbeds are filled. It has caused the deaths of several tourists who were in the riverbeds when the bore came in. Tour boat operators offer rafting excursions in the summer.
 The bore is fastest and highest on some of the smaller rivers that connect to the bay including the River Hebert and Maccan River on the Cumberland Basin, the St. Croix and Kennetcook rivers in the Minas Basin, and the Salmon River in Truro.

Mexico
Historically, there was a tidal bore on the Gulf of California in Mexico at the mouth of the Colorado River. It formed in the estuary about Montague Island and propagated upstream. It was once very strong, but diversions of the river for irrigation have weakened the flow of the river to the point the tidal bore has nearly disappeared.

South America

Brazil
It is known locally as the pororoca.
 Mearim River in Brazil
 Araguari River in Brazil. Very strong in the past, it is considered lost since 2015, due to buffaloes farming, irrigation, and dam construction along the river, leading to substantial loss of water flow.

Venezuela
 Orinoco River in Venezuela

Lakes with tidal bores
Lakes with an ocean inlet can also exhibit tidal bores.

North America
 Nitinat Lake on Vancouver Island has a sometimes dangerous tidal bore at Nitinat Narrows where the lake meets the Pacific Ocean. The lake is popular with windsurfers due to its consistent winds.

See also

 1812 New Madrid earthquake, a historic earthquake in the United States that caused the Mississippi River to flow backwards temporarily
 Tidal race
 Tsunami
 Tonlé Sap, a lake and river system in Cambodia where monsoon flooding can cause the river to flow backwards temporarily albeit not as a tidal bore

References

External links

 Information about The Severn bore, UK
 Amateur video of the "Wiggenhall Wave" tidal bore
 link to Proudman Inst. page
 Mascaret, Aegir, Pororoca, Tidal Bore. Quid ? Où? Quand? Comment? Pourquoi ? in Journal La Houille Blanche, No. 3, pp. 103–14
 Turbulent Mixing beneath an Undular Bore Front in Journal of Coastal Research, Vol. 24, No. 4, pp. 999–1007 
 Tidal bore research (2017) The University of Queensland.

 
Fluid dynamics
Wave mechanics
River surfing
Articles containing video clips